Luzerne is a borough located  north of Wilkes Barre in Luzerne County, Pennsylvania, United States.

The population was 2,703 at the time of the 2020 census.

History
The community was first settled in 1807. It was later incorporated as a borough in 1882. Like Luzerne County, the borough was named after Chevalier de la Luzerne, a French diplomat. 

In the early twentieth century, coal mining and manufacturing were the main industries in the community. The borough had coal mines, a foundry, drill factories, flour and feed mills, a canning factory, and a silk mill.

Geography
Luzerne is located at  (41.283780, -75.892890).

Demographics

As of the census of 2000, there were 2,952 people, 1,410 households, and 767 families living in the borough.

The population density was 4,299.3 people per square mile (1,651.8/km2). There were 1,520 housing units at an average density of 2,213.7 per square mile (850.5/km2).

The racial makeup of the borough was 98.92% White, 0.34% African American, 0.07% Asian, 0.20% from other races, and 0.47% from two or more races. Hispanic or Latino of any race were 0.44% of the population.

There were 1,410 households, out of which 20.2% had children under the age of eighteen living with them; 38.7% were married couples living together, 11.0% had a female householder with no husband present, and 45.6% were non-families. 40.9% of all households were made up of individuals, and 21.0% had someone living alone who was sixty-five years of age or older.

The average household size was 2.09 and the average family size was 2.87.

In the borough the population was spread out, with 17.6% under the age of eighteen, 7.3% from eighteen to twenty-four, 28.7% from twenty-five to forty-four, 22.5% from forty-five to sixty-four, and 23.9% who were sixty-five years of age or older. The median age was forty-three years.

For every one hundred females there were 88.7 males. For every one hundred females aged eighteen and over, there were 86.6 males.

The median income for a household in the borough was $27,614, and the median income for a family was $37,730. Males had a median income of $27,054 compared with that of $21,250 for females.

The per capita income for the borough was $16,217.

Roughly 6.8% of families and 11.4% of the population were living below the poverty line, including 14.5% of those who were under the age of eighteen and 10.9% of those who were aged sixty-five or over.

See also

 List of towns and boroughs in Pennsylvania

References

External links

Populated places established in 1807
Boroughs in Luzerne County, Pennsylvania
1882 establishments in Pennsylvania